Vito William "Billy Jack" Giacalone (April 16, 1923 – February 19, 2012) was an American organized crime figure in Detroit who served as a capo in the Detroit Partnership. He was the younger brother of Anthony "Tony Jack" Giacalone, also a capo in the Detroit Partnership.

Vito Giacalone was described in a 1992 court document as "the most important figure in the Detroit 'Family' after its 'boss' Jack Tocco". Furthermore, a 1992 IRS document cited Giacalone as "one of the prime suspects in the 1975 disappearance of former Teamsters leader James R. Hoffa".

References

1923 births
2012 deaths
Detroit Partnership
American gangsters of Italian descent